is a Japanese footballer who plays for Vegalta Sendai.

Club statistics
Updated to end of 2021 season.

International 

 Japan national under-16 football team
 Japan national under-17 football team
 Japan national under-18 football team
 2014 AFC U-19 Championship Qualifiers
 Japan national under-19 football team

References

External links
 
Profile at Tokushima Vortis
Profile at Vegalta Sendai
 
 

1995 births
Living people
Association football people from Osaka Prefecture
People from Ibaraki, Osaka
Japanese footballers
J1 League players
J2 League players
J3 League players
Gamba Osaka players
Tokushima Vortis players
Sagan Tosu players
J.League U-22 Selection players
Vegalta Sendai players
Association football defenders